Fazlay Rabbi (born 16 May 1996) is a Bangladeshi footballer who plays as a midfielder for Muktijoddha Sangsad KC and the Bangladesh national football team.

Career

International
Rabbi made his senior international debut on 24 March 2016, coming on as an 82nd-minute substitute for Atiqur Rahman Meshu in an 8-0 World Cup qualifying defeat to Jordan.

Career statistics

International

References

External links
Fazlay Rabbi at Eurosport

1995 births
Living people
Sheikh Russel KC players
Sheikh Jamal Dhanmondi Club players
Rahmatganj MFS players
Muktijoddha Sangsad KC players
Bangladesh Football Premier League players
Bangladesh Premier League players
Bangladeshi footballers
Bangladesh international footballers
Association football defenders